Franky Van Haesebroucke (born 31 July 1970 in Deinze, Belgium) is a former Belgian professional racing cyclist and formerly riding for Navigators Insurance Cycling Team. He was active as a professional cyclist from 1993 to 2001

References

 
https://www.procyclingstats.com/rider/franky-van-haesebroucke

1970 births
Living people
Belgian male cyclists
Belgian track cyclists
People from Deinze
Cyclists from East Flanders